is a railway station in the city of Fukushima, Fukushima Prefecture, Japan operated by Fukushima Kōtsū.

Lines

Station layout
Sasaya Station has one island platform with a level crossing, serving two tracks. There is a ticket window, a proof-of-departure ticket machine, a restroom, and a beverage vending machine located at the station.

Adjacent stations

History
It was renamed to its present name on February 10, 1925..

Surrounding area
Sasaya Post Office
Fukushima Dai-Ichi Hospital

See also
 List of railway stations in Japan

External links

  

Railway stations in Japan opened in 1924
Railway stations in Fukushima Prefecture
Fukushima Kōtsū Iizaka Line
Fukushima (city)